Belina (before 1948 Beňa, Biena) is a village and municipality in the Lučenec District in the Banská Bystrica Region of Slovakia.

History
In historical records, the village was first mentioned in 1371 (Bezin). The territory of the village however was first mentioned as terra Baldun in 1240. In 1371, it belonged to the knight Ratold, in the 15th century to the noble family Derencsény and in the late 16th century to the Lorántfy family.

Genealogical resources

The records for genealogical research are available at the state archive "Statny Archiv in Banska Bystrica, Slovakia"

 Roman Catholic church records (births/marriages/deaths): 1785-1897 (parish B)

See also
 List of municipalities and towns in Slovakia

External links
https://web.archive.org/web/20070427022352/http://www.statistics.sk/mosmis/eng/run.html
Surnames of living people in Belina

Villages and municipalities in Lučenec District